Prochoreutis inflatella, the skullcap skeletonizer moth,  is a moth of the family Choreutidae. It is found in eastern North America.

The wingspan is 9–11 mm. The forewings are dark brown with heavy whitish dusting. The basal area and postmedian area are drab orange, sometimes reddish. The antemedian line is metallic silver, sharply bent outwards, but usually obscure. The postmedian line is metallic silver and sharply bent outwards in the lower half. The fringe is pale with a dark brown base. The hindwings are brown, but darker towards the outer margin. There is a long and thin metallic silver line near the anal angle. The body is dark  brown.

Adults are on wing from June to September. There are several generations per year.

The larvae feed on Scutellaria species, including Scutellaria lateriflora. They skeletonise the leaves, bending the leaf upwards and the edges together. They feed under slight webbing. The first larvae appear in March, only shortly after the host plant begins growth. Pupation occurs in a fusiform, multi-layered cocoon of white silk.

References

External links
mothphotographersgroup
microleps.org
Bug Guide

Prochoreutis